Flexidraw is a 1985 graphics computer program published by Inkwell Systems.

Gameplay
Flexidraw is a graphics program that allows users to produce drawings using a light pen and print them.

Reception
Roy Wagner reviewed the product for Computer Gaming World, and stated that "Of the many graphics programs available Flexidraw is certainly the best supported by  parent company."

References

External links
Review in Commodore Magazine
Review in Ahoy!
Review in Compute!'s Gazette
Review in Info

Graphics software